This is a list of the National Register of Historic Places listings in Marshall County, Iowa.

This is intended to be a complete list of the properties and districts on the National Register of Historic Places in Marshall County, Iowa, United States.  Latitude and longitude coordinates are provided for many National Register properties and districts; these locations may be seen together in a map.

There are 16 properties and districts listed on the National Register in the county.  Another property was once listed but has been removed.

|}

Former listing

|}

See also

 List of National Historic Landmarks in Iowa
 National Register of Historic Places listings in Iowa
 Listings in neighboring counties: Grundy, Hardin, Jasper, Story, Tama

References

Marshall
Buildings and structures in Marshall County, Iowa